Susan Krumins (née Kuijken; born 8 July 1986) is a Dutch middle- and long-distance runner. She was the 5000 metres bronze medalist at the 2014 European Athletics Championships and also won a 3000 metres bronze at the 2014 IAAF Continental Cup.

Kuijken has twice represented the Netherlands at the World Championships in Athletics, with her best finish being eighth in the 5000 m in 2013. Across all age categories, she has competed seven times at the European Cross Country Championships. She competed for Florida State University and was the NCAA champion in the indoor 3000 m (2008) and the outdoor 1500 m (2009).

She won European junior medals in 2005 in track and cross country and later took the under-23 title at the 2008 European Cross Country Championships. Among her personal bests are 4:05.38 minutes for the 1500 metres, 8:36.08 minutes for the 3000 m, and 15:00.69 minutes for the 5000 metres.

Career

Early life and career
Born in Nijmegen, she made her international debut in cross country running, competing in the junior section of the 2002 European Cross Country Championships and finishing in 34th. She returned at the 2003 edition but managed only 69th on that attempt. Her first international medals came at the 2003 European Youth Olympic Festival, where she was the gold medallist over 3000 metres and bronze medallist at 1500 metres. Her first global events came the year after: she ranked 71st in the junior race at the 2004 IAAF World Cross Country Championships, but did not finish in the 3000 m at the 2004 World Junior Championships in Athletics. She performed better at continental level, coming 39th at the 2004 European Cross Country Championships.

Kuijken set a series of personal bests on the track in 2005: 2:06.25 minutes for the 800 metres, 4:19.72 minutes for the 1500 m (for seventh at the 2005 European Cup event), 9:28.45 minutes for the 3000 m (part of a silver medal win at the 2005 European Athletics Junior Championships) and 10:42.93 minutes for the 3000 metres steeplechase. On grass, she was a junior bronze medallist at the 2005 European Cross Country Championships and placed 58th at the junior race at the 2005 IAAF World Cross Country Championships.

Collegiate athletics
At the end of 2005 she started attending Florida State University, doing a major in psychology, and began competing with the Florida State Seminoles athletic team. She was the 3000 m runner-up at the Atlantic Coast Conference championship and placed 27th at the NCAA Women's Division I Cross Country Championship. In her sole international outing that year, she came 16th in the under-23 race at the 2006 European Cross Country Championships. In 2007 a focus on the 1500 m distance brought results as she greatly improved her best to 4:11.34 minutes – a time which brought her second place at the NCAA Outdoor Championships. She ranked third at that year's NCAA Cross Country meet. In European competition she was fourth in the 1500 m at the 2007 European Athletics U23 Championships, but failed to finish in the age category race at the 2007 European Cross Country Championships.

She reached to top of the American collegiate scene in the indoor 2008 season. After winning the mile run at the Atlantic Coast Conference (ACC) indoor meet, she claimed the 3000 m title at the NCAA Indoor Championships in a conference record time of 8:58.14 minutes. She failed to match this outdoors after suffering a mid-season injury, ending up eighth in the 1500 m at the NCAA Outdoors, but was in good form at the NCAA Cross Country Championships and was the runner-up. A gold medal came in the under-23 section at the 2008 European Cross Country Championships.

Her most successful collegiate season was in 2009. She started with a win at the ACC indoor championships and a runner-up finish at the NCAA Indoor Championships, then a win over 5000 metres came at the ACC outdoor championships. She secured the collegiate title in the 1500 m at the 2009 NCAA Outdoor Championships and placed third at the NCAA Cross Country Championships. Her performances led to Florida State University winning the team titles in ACC competition indoors, outdoors and in cross country.

Professional running
A personal best of 4:05.86 minutes for the 1500 m brought her selection for the 2009 World Championships in Athletics, although she did not make it out of the heats stage. Kuijken began competing professionally in 2010 and made her European senior debut at the 2010 European Athletics Championships (running in the heats only). She missed most of the 2011 season and on her return in 2012 her form was past her peak, with her season's best being 4:10.84 minutes.

The 2013 season saw Kuijken hit new levels of performance. At the Golden Spike Ostrava she was the 1500 m runner-up in a best of 4:05.38 minutes. She set a Dutch record of 5:38.37 minutes for the 2000 metres distance. She won the 3000 m gold medal in the First League of the 2013 European Team Championships and ran a best of 8:39.65 minutes for the distance when placing fourth at the Rieti Meeting (which ranked her first among Europeans for the distance that year). A run of 15:04.36 minutes at the Bislett Games made her the top European that season and she went on to finish eighth in the final of that event at the 2013 World Championships in Athletics – Europe's best performer.

At the start of 2014 she set an early world leading time of 4:07.21 minutes for the 1500 m while winning at the Perth Track Classic. She won her first national title later that year at that distance. She was selected to run the 5000 m at the 2014 European Athletics Championships and came third behind compatriot Sifan Hassan and Meraf Bahta (both African-born). Her first global medal came at the end of the track season at the 2014 IAAF Continental Cup, where she represented Europe and was 3000 m bronze medallist behind Genzebe Dibaba and Meraf.

In 2015, Kuijken ran 31:54.32 to place 10th at 2015 World Championships in Athletics – Women's 10,000 metres and 15:08.00 to place 8th at 2015 World Championships in Athletics – Women's 5000 metres.

In 2016, Kuijken ran 31:32.43 to place 14th at Athletics at the 2016 Summer Olympics – Women's 10,000 metres.

Feb 11th 2017 - Schoorl 10k road 31:43 (1st)
Mar 27th- Venloop HM (debut) 70:51 (4th)
May 21- Vienna 5k road 15:40 (2nd)
Jun 2nd- Nijmegen 5k 15:21 (4th)
Jun 24th- Euro Cup 3k 9:03 (4th)
Jul 22nd- Heusden 5k 14:53 (1st)
Aug 8th- London WC Final 10k 31:20 (5th)
Aug 10th- London WC Heat 5k 14:57 (4th)
Aug 13th- London WC Final 5k 14:58 (8th)
Aug 20th- Birmingham DL 3k 8:34 (7th)
Aug 27th- Berlin CL 1500m 4:02 (3rd)
Sep 1st- Brussels 2017 Diamond League Final 5k 14:51 (9th)

In 2017, Krumins rac 31:20.24 to place 5th at 2017 World Championships in Athletics – Women's 10,000 metres and 14:58.33 to place 8th at 2017 World Championships in Athletics – Women's 5000 metres.

Personal bests

800 metres – 2:02.24 min (2009)
1000 metres – 2:38.01 min (2014)
1500 metres – 4:02.25 min (2017)
Mile run (indoor) – 4:34.11 min (2009)
Mile run (road) – 4:18 min (2013)
2000 metres – 5:38.37 min (2013)
3000 metres – 8:34.31 min (2017)
3000 metres indoor – 8:56.27 min (2009)
Two miles – 9:23.52 min (2014)
5000 metres – 14:51.25 min (2017)
10,000 metres – 31:05.40 min (2019)
3000 metres steeplechase – 10:42.93 min (2005)

National titles
Dutch Athletics Championships
1500 metres: 2014

International competitions

See also
List of European Athletics Championships medalists (women)
Netherlands at the European Athletics Championships

References

External links

 Official website
 Susan Krumins profile on Instagram
 Susan Krumins profile on Twitter

1986 births
Living people
Dutch female long-distance runners
Dutch female middle-distance runners
Dutch female steeplechase runners
Sportspeople from Nijmegen
World Athletics Championships athletes for the Netherlands
Florida State Seminoles women's track and field athletes
European Athletics Championships medalists
Athletes (track and field) at the 2016 Summer Olympics
Olympic athletes of the Netherlands
Florida State Seminoles women's cross country runners
Athletes (track and field) at the 2020 Summer Olympics
20th-century Dutch women
21st-century Dutch women